Zhang Yijiong (born 26 October 1955) is a Chinese politician, previously serving from 2012 to 2022 as the executive deputy head of the United Front Work Department of the Chinese Communist Party (minister-level).

Zhang was born in Shanghai. In January 1971, Zhang joined the Chinese Communist Party. He began his political career as the deputy head of the Communist Youth League organization in Qinghai province. He also worked at a potash mine, and was president of the Qinghai Potash Factory. He also served as the head of the economic and trade commission of Qinghai, and party chief of the provincial capital Xining.

In November 2000, Zhang became a member of the provincial Party Standing Committee. In December 2006, he became the deputy party chief of Tibet Autonomous Region. In October 2010 he was made Political and Legal Affairs Commission Secretary of Tibet. In December 2012, he was transferred to become deputy party chief of Jiangxi. In February 2012, he joined the provincial-ministerial ranks, becoming the Chair of the Political Consultative Conference of Jiangxi province.

In June 2012, he was made executive deputy head of the United Front Work Department of the Communist Party.

Zhang was an alternate member of the 17th Central Committee of the Chinese Communist Party, and a full member of the 18th Central Committee.

References

Living people
1955 births
People's Republic of China politicians from Shanghai
Political office-holders in Tibet
Political office-holders in Jiangxi
Alternate members of the 17th Central Committee of the Chinese Communist Party
Members of the 18th Central Committee of the Chinese Communist Party
Members of the 19th Central Committee of the Chinese Communist Party